The 2016 Missouri Secretary of State election was held on November 8, 2016, to elect the Missouri Secretary of State, concurrently with the 2016 U.S. presidential election, as well as elections to the United States Senate and those to the United States House of Representatives and various state and local elections.

Incumbent Democratic secretary of state Jason Kander did not run for re-election to a second term in office and instead unsuccessfully ran in that year's U.S. Senate election for the seat held by Republican incumbent Roy Blunt.

Democratic primary

Candidates

Declared
 MD Rabbi Alam, candidate in 2012
 Robin Smith, reporter and former KMOV anchor
 Bill Clinton Young, perennial candidate

Withdrawn
 Elad Gross, Assistant Missouri Attorney General and nonprofit executive
 Jason Kander, incumbent secretary of state (running for the U.S. Senate)

Declined
 Jeremy LaFaver, state representative
 Mike Sanders, Jackson County Executive, former Jackson County Prosecuting Attorney and former chairman of the Missouri Democratic Party
 Stephen Webber, state representative
 Clint Zweifel, State Treasurer of Missouri

Endorsements

Polling

Results

Republican primary

Candidates

Declared
 Jay Ashcroft, attorney, engineer and nominee for the state senate in 2014
 Roi Chinn
 Will Kraus, state senator

Declined
 Tim Jones, Speaker of the Missouri House of Representatives
 Mike Kehoe, state senator
 Mike Parson, state senator (running for lieutenant governor)
 Shane Schoeller, Greene County Clerk, former Speaker of the Missouri House of Representatives and nominee for secretary of state in 2012

Endorsements

Polling

Results

Libertarian primary

Candidates

Declared
 Chris Morrill

Results

Third parties

Green Party
 Julie George-Carlson

General election

Polling

Results

See also
2016 Missouri gubernatorial election

References

External links
Official campaign websites
Jay Ashcroft for Secretary of State
Will Kraus for Secretary of State
Robin Smith for Secretary of State
Chris Morrill for Secretary of State

Secretary of State
Missouri Secretary of State elections
Missouri
November 2016 events in the United States